Countess Walburgis of Rietberg (1555/56, Rietberg – 26 May 1586, Esens) was 1565–1576 and 1584–1586 Countess of Rietberg.

Life
Walburgis was the second daughter of Count John II of Rietberg and Agnes of Bentheim-Steinfurt in Rietberg.  After the birth of John Edzard, her youngest child and only son, Walburgis needed to recover and moved from Esens to Wittmund.  A short time later, she moved back to Esens, where she died on 26 May 1586 at the age of 30. She was buried in the St. Magnus Church in Esens.  With her death, the Rietberg line of the House of Werl-Arnsberg died out.

After Walburgis's death rumours that she had been handed a poisoned beer soup.  Under torture, one of the three women suspected of the crime confessed.  Although the doctors certified a natural death, the three suspects were burned on the stake on 11 May 1586.

Marriage and descendants 

On 1 May 1577, at the age of 21 years, Walburgis was engaged to Count Enno III of East Frisia, who was then 14 years old.  The wedding took place on 28 January 1581, when Enno was 18. From this marriage, she had three children:
 Sabina Catherine (born: 11 August 1582 – died: 31 May 1618)
 married on 4 March 1601 her uncle Count John III of East Frisia (born: 1566 – died: 29 September 1625)
 Agnes (born: 1 January 1584 – died: 28 February 1616)
 married on 15 August 1603 Prince Gundakar of Liechtenstein (born: 30 January 1580 – died: 5 August 1658)
 John Edzard (born: 2 March 1586 – died: 13 March 1586), buried in the St. Magnus Church in Esens

External links
 Profile, kaunitz-rietberg.de; accessed 19 February 2015. 

Countesses of Rietberg
Countesses of East Frisia
House of Cirksena
16th-century German people
1550s births
1586 deaths
Year of birth uncertain